Hey!!! is FLOW's twenty-second single. Its A-Side was used as the third opening theme song for the anime Beelzebub. The single has two editions: regular and limited. The limited edition comes with a bonus DVD that contains extra footage. It reached number 23 on the Oricon charts and charted for 2 weeks. *

Track listing

Bonus DVD track listing

References

2011 singles
2011 songs
Flow (band) songs
Ki/oon Music singles
Anime songs